Jon Bosak led the creation of the XML specification at the W3C. From 1996–2008, he worked for Sun Microsystems.

XML

Tim Bray, who was one of the editors of the XML specification, has this to say in his note on Bosak in his annotated version of the specification:

In a 1999 posting to the xml-dev mailing list, Bray writes:

When he stepped down from the W3C XML Coordination Group in 2000, Jon Bosak was given the unusual recognition of having a formal identifier reserved for him:

In appreciation for his vision and leadership and dedication the W3C XML Plenary on this 10th day of February, 2000 reserves for Jon Bosak in perpetuity the XML name "xml:Father".

The Universal Business Language

In 2001, Bosak organized the OASIS Universal Business Language Technical Committee to create standard formats for basic electronic business documents. He led the UBL TC through the completion of UBL 2.1 in November 2013 and continues to serve on the Committee as Secretary. UBL was approved for use in European public sector procurement by decision of the European Commission dated 31 October 2014 and published as an International Standard, ISO/IEC 19845:2015, on 15 December 2015.

Metrological Studies 

Bosak is author of the book  (2010) and the article  (latest version 19 April 2014)

Bob Bosak 

Jon Bosak's father, Robert Bosak (1925–1987), began the family's long involvement in the computer industry in 1947 when he went to work on the first computer on the west coast of the US. He joined RAND in 1948 to work on analysis and programming of scientific problems. In 1951, he joined Lockheed Aircraft Corporation, where he organized and directed the Mathematical Analysis Group.  For a short time after his divorce in the 1950s, he shared an apartment with Bob Bemer, "the Father of ASCII."

Bob Bosak returned to RAND in 1956 to become head of programming for the Semi Automatic Ground Environment (SAGE), the automated NORAD system that controlled US air defenses from 1959 to 1983 and
strongly influenced the design of modern air traffic control systems. He was one of the designers of JOVIAL and principal author of the seminal paper An Information Algebra.

References

External links
 Background information at ibiblio
 Interview with JavaWorld
 Schema document for namespace http://www.w3.org/XML/1998/namespace

Year of birth missing (living people)
Living people
Sun Microsystems people
XML Guild